Tegula mariana is a species of sea snail, a marine gastropod mollusk in the family Tegulidae.

Description
The height of the shell varies between 8.9 mm, its diameter 10.5 mm. The shell has a shiny surface. Its color is  dingy white, with broad radiating flames of brown or red above irregularly maculated below, sometimes nearly unicolored, pinkish, with the lirae of the base articulated with red and white dots. The spire is either conic or depressed. The sutures are either simple, linear, or somewhat canaliculate. There is a concavity in the subsutural area. The about 5 whorls are spirally transversed by excessively minute spiral striae. The body whorl has an acute nodulous carina at the periphery, and another angulation or keel at the middle of the upper surface of the whorl and continued upon the spire, and which is usually nodose on the body whorl. There is usually, too, a third ridge or carina, generally coarsely nodose, between the two already described. The base of the shell is more or less convex, generally shows microscopic concentric striae under a lens, and has about 5 low, narrow, separated spiral lirulae. The columella and the inside of the umbilicus are either green or white.

This species is thus characterized by the two angulations on the body whorl and the fine, spiral sculpture between the two keels.

Distribution
This species occurs in the Pacific Ocean and is common under rocks at high-tide level from Baja California, Mexico, to Peru

References

External links
 To GenBank (2 nucleotides; 1 proteins)
 To USNM Invertebrate Zoology Mollusca Collection
 To World Register of Marine Species
 

mariana
Gastropods described in 1919